Kuhestan (also Romanized as Kūhestān; also known as Kabūstān and Kūhestān-e Bālā) is a village in Dinachal Rural District, Pareh Sar District, Rezvanshahr County, Gilan Province, Iran. At the 2006 census, its population was 1,455, in 359 families.

References 

Populated places in Rezvanshahr County